Storfjord Church is a parish church of the Church of Norway in Storfjord Municipality in Troms og Finnmark county, Norway. It is located in the village of Hatteng. It is the main church for the Storfjord parish which is part of the Nord-Troms prosti (deanery) in the Diocese of Nord-Hålogaland. The white, wooden church was built in an empire style in a long church design in 1952 using plans drawn up by the architect Bjarne Bystad Ellefsen. The church seats about 320 people.

History
The first church in Storfjord was built in 1917. It was a school house from 1911 that was renovated and expanded in 1917 to make it into a church. That building was jointly used as a school and a church for many years. After World War II in 1952, the parish built a new, larger church, just to the southwest of the old church. The new church was consecrated in 1952. Afterwards, the old building was solely used as a school.

See also
List of churches in Nord-Hålogaland

References

Storfjord
Churches in Troms
Wooden churches in Norway
20th-century Church of Norway church buildings
Churches completed in 1952
1917 establishments in Norway
Long churches in Norway